Dorithia trigonana is a species of moth of the family Tortricidae. It is found in Arizona in the United States and Durango in Mexico.

The wingspan is 19–21 mm.

References

Moths described in 1991
Euliini